Oxonium may refer to:
Oxonium ion, any ion which contains a trivalent oxygen atom, 
Oxonium, an IUPAC name for the simplest oxonium ion, hydronium, 
Oxonium (often abbreviated to Oxon.), sometimes used in university circles as a Latin name for Oxford University in England